Carrie is a 2013 American supernatural horror film directed by Kimberly Peirce. It is the third film adaptation and a remake to the 1976 adaptation  of Stephen King's 1974 novel of the same name and the fourth film in the Carrie franchise. The film was produced by Kevin Misher, with a screenplay by Lawrence D. Cohen and Roberto Aguirre-Sacasa. The film stars Chloë Grace Moretz as the titular character Carrie White, alongside Julianne Moore as Margaret White. The cast also features Judy Greer, Portia Doubleday, Gabriella Wilde, Ansel Elgort and Alex Russell. The film is a modern re-imagining of King's novel about a shy girl outcast by her peers and sheltered by her deeply religious mother, who uses her telekinetic powers with devastating effect after falling victim to a cruel prank at her senior prom.

The film held its world premiere at the Arclight Hollywood in Los Angeles on October 7, 2013, and was released in the United States by Metro-Goldwyn-Mayer and Screen Gems on October 18. The film received mixed reviews, with critics calling it "unnecessary" and criticizing the lack of originality and scares, though they praised the modern updates and cast. It grossed $84 million worldwide at the box office.

Plot
 

Disturbed religious fanatic Margaret White sits alone in her home on her bed and gives birth to a baby girl. She intends to kill the infant but changes her mind.

Years later, her daughter Carrie, a shy, unassertive girl, nears her graduation from Ewen High School in Maine. While showering after the gym at school, Carrie experiences her first menstrual period. Never having been taught to prepare for this, she believes she is bleeding to death and runs out of the shower yelling for help. The other girls ridicule her by throwing tampons and pads at her. Longtime bully Christine "Chris" Hargensen records everything on her smartphone and uploads it to YouTube. The school's physical education teacher Miss Rita Desjardin, comforts Carrie and sends her home with Margaret, who believes menstruation is a sin. Margaret demands that Carrie abstain from showering with the others. When Carrie refuses, Margaret hits her in the forehead with a Bible and locks her in her "prayer closet". As Carrie screams to be let out, a crack appears on the door, and the crucifix in the closet begins to bleed. Carrie begins to experience more signs over the oncoming days that point to her having telekinesis. She researches her abilities, learning to harness them.

Miss Desjardin threatens the girls who teased Carrie with an ultimatum: either endure boot-camp-style detention for their behavior or be suspended from school, prohibiting them from attending prom; Chris is the only one who refuses to take part in detention and is suspended from school after denying the allegation and refusing to give up her smartphone. Sue Snell regrets her part in the incident. To make amends, she asks her boyfriend, Tommy Ross, to take Carrie to the prom. Carrie accepts Tommy's invitation and makes a prom dress at home. Her mother, Margaret, forbids Carrie to attend. Asking her mother to relent, Carrie manifests her telekinesis. Margaret believes this power comes from the Devil and is proof that Carrie has been corrupted by sin. Meanwhile, Chris, her boyfriend Billy Nolan, and his friends plan revenge on Carrie; they obtain pig blood to put in a bucket.

On Prom Night, Margaret tries to prevent Carrie from going, but Carrie uses her powers to lock her mother in the closet. At the prom, Carrie is nervous and shy, but Tommy kindly puts her at ease. As part of Chris and Billy's plan, Chris's friend, Tina Blake, discreetly slips fake ballots into the voting box, which names Carrie and Tommy as prom queen and king. At home, Sue receives a text from Chris, taunting her about her scheme to humiliate Carrie. Sue drives to the prom, arriving just as Carrie and Tommy are about to be crowned. Billy warns Chris not to tell anyone about the bucket as it is criminal assault; Chris agrees to say nothing. Sue sees the bucket of blood dangling above Carrie and attempts to warn someone. Desjardin locks her out of the gym, suspecting that Sue plans to hurt Carrie.

Chris dumps the blood onto Carrie and Tommy. Nicki plays the "shower video" of Carrie on the large screens above the stage, inciting laughter from some in the audience. Carrie pushes Miss Desjardin with her powers when Desjardin attempts to help her. The bucket falls onto Tommy's head, killing him. Enraged, Carrie takes her revenge and uses her telekinesis to kill nearly every student and staff, but spares Desjardin. An electrical wire merges with leaking water, and a fire breaks out. As the school burns to the ground, Carrie walks away, leaving behind a trail of destruction. Chris and Billy attempt to drive away, but Carrie crashes the car, killing Billy. Chris attempts to run Carrie over, but Carrie lifts the car and throws it at a gas station, killing Chris, who's face goes through the windshield. Carrie tips over an electric power pole, exploding and setting the car on fire.

Carrie arrives home and takes a bath and changes into her nightgown afterward. Carrie tearfully tells Margaret about the prank. Carrie and Margaret embrace and Margaret recounts Carrie's conception. After having shared a bed platonically with her husband, they yielded to temptation one night, and, after praying for strength, Carrie's father "took" Margaret, who enjoyed the experience. After the talk, Margaret stabs Carrie in the back with a knife. She declares that she must kill Carrie in order to prevent the Devil from possessing her again and attacks Carrie, but Carrie kills her with many sharp tools. She becomes hysterical and makes stones rain from the sky to crush the house. When Sue arrives, a furious Carrie lifts her with her powers but senses that Sue is pregnant with a baby girl. Carrie protects Sue and throws her out of the house to safety as the house collapses and sinks, apparently killing Carrie as well.

After giving her testimony in court regarding the prom incident, Sue visits Carrie and Margaret's grave, which has been vandalized to read "CARRIE WHITE BURNS IN HELL", and places white roses by the headstone. As she leaves, the gravestone begins to break, and Carrie's enraged scream is heard.

Cast

 Chloë Grace Moretz  as Carrie White
 Julianne Moore as Margaret White
 Judy Greer as Miss Desjardin
 Gabriella Wilde as Sue Snell
 Portia Doubleday as Chris Hargensen
 Alex Russell as Billy Nolan
 Ansel Elgort as Tommy Ross
 Barry Shabaka Henley as Principal Henry Morton
 Zoë Belkin as Tina Blake
 Karissa Strain as Nicki Watson
 Katie Strain as Lizzy Watson
 Samantha Weinstein as Heather Mason
 Demetrius Joyette as George Dawson
 Mouna Traoré as Erika Langton 
 Hart Bochner as John Hargensen (uncredited)

Production
In May 2011, representatives from MGM and Screen Gems announced that the two companies were producing a film remake of Carrie. The two studios hired Spider-Man: Turn Off the Dark playwright Roberto Aguirre-Sacasa to write a screenplay that delivers "a more faithful adaption" of King's novel. Aguirre-Sacasa previously adapted King's work The Stand into a comic book in 2008. Reshoots were ordered, as the screenplay was re-written by Lawrence D. Cohen, who also wrote the original film.

Upon hearing of the new adaptation, King remarked: "The real question is why, when the original was so good?" He also suggested Lindsay Lohan for the main role and stated that "it [the film] would certainly be fun to cast". Actress Sissy Spacek, who played Carrie in the 1976 adaptation, expressed an opinion on the choice of Lohan for the character of Carrie White, stating that she "was like, 'Oh my God, she's really a beautiful girl' and so I was very flattered that they were casting someone to look like me instead of the real Carrie described in the book. It's gonna be real interesting". In March 2012, the role of Carrie White was offered to Chloë Grace Moretz, who accepted the role.

Kimberly Peirce directed the film, while Moore starred as Margaret White and Gabriella Wilde played Sue Snell. Alex Russell and Ansel Elgort were cast in key roles, and Judy Greer played the gym teacher Miss Desjardin.

Principal photography began on June 27, 2012, and wrapped on August.

Release
The original release date was March 15, 2013, but the release date was moved to October 18.

Sony held a "First Look" event at the New York Comic Con on October 13, 2013, that allowed attendees to view the film prior to the release date. The event was followed by a panel session with several members of the cast and crew.

Trailers for the film included a phone number that offered promotions to the caller, as well as a recording of a simulated encounter with characters from the film.

Home video
The film was released on DVD and Blu-ray on January 14, 2014. The Blu-ray features an alternative opening and ending and nine deleted scenes.

In the alternative opening, a young Carrie has a discussion with her teenage neighbor, who is sun-bathing, over the fact that Margaret believes that women with breasts are sinful. Margaret catches them in the conversation and believes that the neighbor is offending Carrie, not before the neighbor's mother disagrees with her. Suddenly, stones begin to rain only on the White household. Margaret, believing it is a sign from God, takes shelter inside her home with a distressed Carrie.

In the alternative ending, the cracking gravestone and the court speech are not present. After placing the roses on Carrie's grave, Sue suddenly feels pain from her pregnancy and begins to go into labor. Sue is in the hospital and is preparing to give birth to her baby. As she struggles to give birth, Carrie's bloody hand suddenly emerges and grabs Sue's arm. Sue screams loudly as she wakes up in her own bedroom with her mother comforting her and telling her that her nightmare is over. A subliminal frame image of Carrie's bloodied arm is seen grabbing onto Sue's arm as Sue continues to scream in her room.

Reception

Critical reception
The review aggregator website Rotten Tomatoes reported a 50% approval rating with an average rating of 5.49/10 based on 187 reviews. The website's critical consensus reads: "It boasts a talented cast, but Kimberly Peirce's 'reimagining' of Brian De Palma's horror classic finds little new in the Stephen King novel -- and feels woefully unnecessary". On Metacritic, it scored a 53 out of 100 based on 34 reviews, indicating "mixed or average reviews". Audiences polled by CinemaScore gave the film an average grade of "B-" on an A+ to F scale.

Kevin C. Johnson of the St. Louis Post-Dispatch gave the film a favorable review: "Long before the blood starts spilling, it's clear the new team has mostly nailed it. The reboot is as good a Carrie remake as possible, though it's not truly a scary movie; the film takes its time living up to its R rating". Mick LaSalle of the San Francisco Chronicle also gave the film a favorable review: "In a way, the new Carrie is almost too easy to enjoy. Everything discordant and all the nagging weirdness and strange feelings surrounding the original have been smoothed down, and what we're left with is a well-made, highly satisfying and not particularly deep high school revenge movie". Michael Phillips of the Chicago Tribune gave the film a positive review: "The acting's strong; in addition to Moretz and Moore, Judy Greer is a welcome presence in the Betty Buckley role of the sympathetic gym instructor. But something's missing from this well-made venture. What's there is more than respectable, while staying this side of surprising". Joe Neumaier of the New York Daily News gave it three out of five stars: "With the exception of some appearances by social media, Carrie doesn't try to hip up King's basic, often slow story. And while De Palma's version is fondly recalled as a high-blood-mark of the 1970s, this new take seems to linger a bit more on the bugaboos of overparenting and bullying while underplaying Mama's fanaticism. Peirce only glancingly lets her heroine have a mild discovery-of-powers moment that feels 'X-Men'-ish". In a positive review on Roger Ebert's website, Matt Zoller Seitz awarded the film three out of four stars, praising the portrayal of Carrie and Margaret's relationship and the feelings of sympathy Carrie manages to evoke, although he criticizes the representation of Chris as "exaggeratedly evil". Seitz ultimately concludes by stating: "The first Carrie was horror. This is tragedy". A. A. Dowd of The A.V. Club gave the film a C− rating, criticizing Moretz's Carrie as "too adjusted, coming across less like the 'very peculiar girl' King described in his novel and more like the stealth babe of some nottie-to-hottie teen romance". Dowd lamented on the film as a whole: "It's a strange thing to say about a movie so obsessed with the red stuff, but this Carrie is bloodless".

Box office
Sony estimated the revenue for the opening weekend of Carrie as between $16 million and $18 million, while others estimated a bigger margin of $24 million to $28 million due to the Halloween season. However, the final takings totaled $16.1 million and the film was ranked at number 3 behind Gravity and Captain Philips, both of which were in their second and third weeks, respectively. By the end of the week, the film managed to gross $20.1 million. In week two, the film slipped 62.8% to sixth place with $5.9 million and 43.2% to ninth place in its third week with $3.4 million.

At the end of its run, the film has grossed $35.3 million in North America and $49.5 million in other countries for a worldwide gross of $84.8 million. It is the 67th highest-grossing film of 2013 in the United States.

Accolades

References

External links

 
 
 
 
 

2013 films
2013 horror films
2010s high school films
2010s horror drama films
2010s psychological horror films
2010s supernatural horror films
2010s teen horror films
American films about revenge
American high school films
American horror drama films
American psychological horror films
American supernatural horror films
American teen horror films
Carrie (franchise)
Films about sexual repression
Films about bullying
Films about child abuse
Films about mass murder
Films about pranks
Films about proms
Films about rape
Films about school violence
Films about telekinesis
Films based on American horror novels
Films based on works by Stephen King
Films directed by Kimberly Peirce
Films scored by Marco Beltrami
Films set in 1995
Films set in 2013
Films set in Maine
Films shot in Toronto
Horror film remakes
Matricide in fiction
Metro-Goldwyn-Mayer films
Religious horror films
Screen Gems films
Films about self-harm
Films with screenplays by Roberto Aguirre-Sacasa
Films about mother–daughter relationships
2010s English-language films
2010s American films